Caherdorgan North is a National Monument located in County Kerry, Ireland.

Location

Caherdorgan Cashel
The cashel has a circular wall, within which are 5 dry stone clocháns with corbelled roofs. A souterrain was once here.

The Chancellor's House

The Chancellor's House (Fothrach an tSainsiléara) is a ruined rectangular stone medieval building. It was probably home to the chancellor (cancellarius) of the Diocese of Ardfert and Aghadoe.

References

Buildings and structures in County Kerry
Tourist attractions in County Kerry
National Monuments in County Kerry